TWIN GATE is Exist Trace's first studio album. Many of the songs on the album had been previously released on EPs.

Songs
DECIDE
Orleans no Shoujo (オルレアンの少女)
KNIFE (Album mix)
Neverland
RESONANCE
VANGUARD
Blaze
unforgive you
Owari no nai Sekai (終わりのない世界)
Cradle

Singles
 Knife (released June 2, 2010)

References

2010 albums
Exist Trace albums
Japanese-language albums